The Bakers Creek air crash was an aviation disaster that occurred on 14 June 1943, when a United States Army Air Forces (USAAF) Boeing B-17 Flying Fortress aircraft crashed at Bakers Creek, Queensland, Australia. Forty military service personnel on board were killed; one person survived the crash. The crash is Australia's deadliest aviation disaster by death toll and was the deadliest accident involving a transport aircraft in the south-western Pacific during World War II.

Aircraft
The aircraft was a Boeing B-17C, serial number 40-2072, known as "Miss Every Morning Fixin".

The six crew and 35 passengers were returning to New Guinea after an R&R break. The aircraft was part of the United States Fifth Air Force, operated by the 46th Troop Carrier Squadron of the 317th Troop Carrier Group. It had formerly been one of the B-17s sent to the Philippines in the autumn of 1941 with the 19th Bomb Group. It had been converted into a transport after suffering heavy battle damage in a mission on 25 December 1941. Over 1,100 bullet holes were found when the plane returned to Darwin.

The plane earned its nickname due to the constant work needed to keep it airworthy. A former maintenance chief estimated that for every eight hours the aircraft flew, it required at least 12 hours of maintenance. During the ten days before the plane's last flight, mechanics installed a new fuel tank and two new engines, and a satisfactory test flight was made on the previous day.

Crash
The aircraft took off from Mackay Airfield just before dawn at about 6 am in foggy conditions, headed for Port Moresby. Soon after, it made a low-altitude turn and crashed a few minutes later. All but one person on board was killed. The cause of the crash remains a mystery.

The sole survivor of the crash, Foye Kenneth Roberts, died at Wichita Falls, Texas, on 4 February 2004. Another man, Joseph Gordon Roberts of Texas, also of the 317th Troop Carrier Group, was due to be a passenger on the plane but missed the flight due to sleeping in and arriving late at the airfield.

Due to wartime censorship, nothing of the incident was reported in the media. The Daily Mercury, Mackay's newspaper, reported the following day that a visiting American serviceman had been injured, as well as an editorial expressing the sentiments of locals who knew what had happened. Nothing more appeared in the local media until 21 August 1945, after the war had ended. Victims' relatives received War Department telegrams which said little more than the serviceman had been killed in an air crash in the southwest Pacific.

Australia's equal second deadliest aviation disaster, the 1960 crash of Trans Australia Airlines Flight 538, also occurred at Mackay Airfield.

Memorials
A memorial was unveiled at Bakers Creek, near Mackay, Australia, on 11 May 1992, consisting of two brick columns aligned northwards on which are mounted flag poles and two brass plaques facing eastwards. Between the columns is a large aircraft propeller of a type fitted to Douglas C-47 airplanes supplied to the Royal Australian Air Force. The plaques describe the crash and list the men known to have perished and the sole survivor. Above the monument is a brass model of a B-17C that was unveiled and saluted by a low-flying 5th AF United States Air Force Lockheed C-130 from Yokota AB, Japan, on 15 June 2003, during 60th Anniversary events marking the crash. A small brass plaque tells about the model. Two brass plaques representing the 46th Troop Carrier Squadron and the 5th Air Force Memorial Foundation are mounted on a plinth in front of the Bakers Creek Memorial. Inside, a spotlight illuminates the memorial for several hours each night. Annual commemorative ceremonies are held at the memorial, usually in June.

Another memorial to the US service members was unveiled in Washington, D.C., on 14 June 2006, at the World War II Memorial. After the unveiling, it was moved temporarily to the Embassy of Australia, Washington, D.C.. Because embassies are considered foreign soil, the Bakers Creek Memorial Association (USA) petitioned American lawmakers to relocate the memorial. After several years of negotiation, a dedication ceremony took place on 11 June 2009 at the Selfridge Gate entrance—in Fort Myer, Virginia—to Arlington National Cemetery.

See also

 List of disasters in Australia by death toll
 United States Army Air Forces in Australia

References

Further reading

External links
 Aviation Enthusiast Corner - details of the crash (Archive)
 Crew List and burial details

1943 in Australia
Aviation accidents and incidents in 1943
Aviation accidents and incidents in Queensland
Disasters in Queensland
Mackay, Queensland
Aviation accidents and incidents involving the Boeing B-17 Flying Fortress
1940s in Queensland
Queensland in World War II
1943 disasters in Australia